This is a list of aviation-related events from 1925.

Events
 In the United Kingdom, the first Royal Auxiliary Air Force squadrons are formed.
 The Eberhart Steel Products Company of Buffalo, New York, forms an aircraft design and manufacturing subsidiary, the Eberhart Aeroplane and Motor Company.
 Summer 1925 – Two Breguet 19 G.R. aircraft owned by the Japanese Asahi Shimbun newspaper group fly from Tokyo, Japan, to Paris, France.

January
 January 1 – The French airline CIDNA is formed.

February
 February 3–4 – In a Breguet 19 G.R., the French aviators Henri Lemaître and Ludovic Arrachart set a world distance record, flying  from Étampes, Paris, France, to Villa Cisneros, Spanish Sahara.
 February 12 – Sabena establishes the first airline connection between Belgium and the Belgian Congo, pioneering a long-haul route to Léopoldville.

March
 March 1 – Ryan Airline Company begins regular services.
March 2 – Huff Daland Dusters is established as the world's first aerial crop dusting company. Founded in Macon, Georgia, in the United States. It formed the roots of Delta Air Service (1928), then Delta Air Corporation (1930, renamed Delta Air Lines in 1945).

April
 April
 The first in-flight movie is shown on a scheduled flight: First National's The Lost World on Imperial Airways service from London to the Continent.
Maurice Drouhin wins in a Salmson 3 Ad-powered Farman Aviette.
 April 13 - The first scheduled air freight service begins in the United States.
 April 15 - Ukvozdukhput begins services in the Ukraine.
 April 21 – Italian aviator Francesco de Pinedo and his mechanic Ernesto Campanelli depart Rome on a 201-day flight in the  SIAI S.16ter flying boat Gennariello that will take them to Australia and Japan before they return to Rome in November.

May
 May 1 - The Imperial Japanese Army Air Corps is established under the command of Lieutenant General Kinichi Yasumitsu. It has 3,700 personnel and about 500 aircraft.
 May 4 – Italian legislation sets the peacetime strength of the Regia Aeronautica (Italian Royal Air Force) at 182 squadrons, with 78 of them assigned directly to the air force, 69 to the Italian Royal Army, and 35 to the Regia Marina (Italian Royal Navy). The army and navy are given temporary command of the squadrons assigned to them for the length of time it takes to train them for wartime operations.

June
 June 10 – Italian aviator Francesco de Pinedo and his mechanic, Ernesto Campanelli, arrive at Melbourne, Australia, after a 50-day flight from Rome in the  SIAI S.16ter flying boat Gennariello during which they have made 27 intermediate stops without serious mishaps. They will remain in Melbourne for 36 days before continuing their journey through Australia and to Japan.
 June 20 - Off New England, a United States Coast Guard Vought UO-1 becomes the first aircraft to pursue a rum-runner.
 June 24 - Off New England, a U.S. Coast Guard Vought UO-1 becomes the first aircraft to assist in the capture of a rum-runner.

July
 July 1 – The United States Post Office Department inaugurates 24-hour transcontinental air mail service. Previously, mailplanes had not flown at night and trains had carried the mail during the hours of darkness, but the completion of a coast-to-coast system of lighted beacons has allowed night flying to become practical along the entire route. The day-and-night flying allows the transcontinental air mail service to deliver mail notably faster than train-only service for the first time.
 July 13 - Western Air Express, the future Western Airlines, is founded. It will begin flight operations in April 1926.
 July 16 – Italian aviator Francesco de Pinedo and his mechanic Ernesto Campanelli resume their flight from Italy to East Asia and the Western Pacific, flying from Melbourne to Sydney, Australia, in the  SIAI S.16ter flying boat Gennariello after a 36-day stay in Melbourne. They had left Rome 86 days earlier and made 28 intermediate stops before arriving in Sydney. They will remain in Sydney for 21 days before continuing their journey through Australia and to Japan.

August
 The Italian government's Commission for Aeronautics is replaced by a new Ministry of Aeronautics. The Regia Aeronautica (Royal Air Force), formerly subordinate to the commission, is subordinated to the new ministry.
 August 6 – Italian aviator Francesco de Pinedo and his mechanic Ernesto Campanelli resume their flight from Italy to East Asia and the Western Pacific, departing Sydney, Australia, in the  SIAI S.16ter flying boat Gennariello on their way to Tokyo.
 August 31 – U.S. Navy Commander John Rodgers and his crew take off from San Francisco, California in a PN-9 flying boat in an attempt to make the first transpacific flight from North America to the Hawaiian Islands. They are forced down in the Pacific Ocean on September 1 after flying 1,841.12 statute miles (2,964.77 km) nonstop. Although unsuccessful, their flight sets a world nonstop distance record for Class C seaplanes which will stand until 1930.

September
 September 1 – After modifications, the aircraft carrier  returns to service with the Royal Navy as the first ship ever to be equipped with a round-down Located at the after end of her flight deck, the round-down, which improves air flow and gives pilots landing aboard Furious greater confidence, will become standard on aircraft carriers.
 September 2 – The U.S. Navy dirigible  breaks up in a storm and crashes near Caldwell, Ohio, killing 14 of her crew. Twenty-nine crew members survive.
 September 3 – The Spanish Navy aviation ship Dédalo, the only ship ever built capable of operating airships, balloons, and seaplanes, accompanies a Spanish fleet to Morocco to participate in the Rif War. Her aircraft and one of the airships she operates support the Spanish campaign to capture Ajir, which falls on October 2. She is the only European aviation ship to see combat between the end of the Russian Civil War and the beginning of World War II.
 September 15 – The Bolivian airline Lloyd Aéreo Boliviano is founded.
 September 23 – The Bolivian airline Lloyd Aéreo Boliviano begins flight operations, flying a Junkers F.13 which takes off from Cochabamba, Bolivia.
 September 26 – Italian aviator Francesco de Pinedo and his mechanic Ernesto Campanelli arrive in Tokyo in the  SIAI S.16ter flying boat Gennariello after a 58-day flight from Sydney, Australia, during which they have made 19 intermediate stops. They had departed Rome 158 days earlier and made 48 intermediate stops, including lengthy stays in Melbourne and Sydney, Australia, on their way to Tokyo, all without an engine change or any serious mishaps.

October
 October 3 or 30 – The Royal Navy cruiser Vindictive launches a Fairey IIID floatplane by catapult. It is the first catapult launch of a standard British naval aircraft from a ship at sea.
 October 15 – The British airship R.33 successfully launches a de Havilland DH.53 Humming Bird piloted by Flying Officer Campbell MacKenzie-Richards and Flying Officer Riggs in flight.
 October 16 – The Air Union Farman F.60 Goliath F-HMFU Île de France crashes at Wadhurst, East Sussex, England, during a scheduled passenger flight from England to Paris, France. Three of the six people aboard die and two suffer injuries.
 October 17 – Italian aviator Francesco de Pinedo and his mechanic Ernesto Campanelli depart Tokyo in the  SIAI S.16ter flying boat Gennariello after a 21-day stay to begin the homeward leg of their flight from Rome to Australia and Tokyo and back again. The only engine change of what has so far been a 187-day, 49-stop flight has been made in Tokyo.
 October 18
He will die of his injuries on October 21, the first professional athlete killed as the result of a plane crash.
 October 19 – Frank T. Courtney makes the first flight in the United Kingdom by a rotary-wing aircraft, demonstrating the Cierva C.4 autogiro for the Royal Aircraft Establishment near Farnborough Airfield.
 October 26 – The 1925 Schneider Trophy race is flown at Baltimore, Maryland, in the United States. Jimmy Doolittle of the United States Army Air Service wins in a Curtiss R3C-2 at an average spee dof .

November
Departing Rome on April 21, their outbound route had taken to them to Brindisi in Italy; Leros in Greece; Baghdad in Iraq; Bushehr and Chabar in Persia; Karachi, Bombay, Cocanada, and Calcutta in British India; Akyab, Rangoon, Tavoy, and Mergui in Burma; Phuket in Siam; Penang in British Malaya; Singapore; Batavia, Surabaya, Sumbawa, and Kupang in the Netherlands East Indies, and Broome, Carnarvon, Perth, Bunbury, Albany, Israelite Bay, Adelaide, and Melbourne, Australia, where they had arrived on June 10 and spent just over five weeks before proceeding to Sydney, where they had arrived on July 16 and spent another three weeks. Resuming their flight on August 6, they had visited Brisbane, Rockhampton, Townsville, Innisfail, and Cooktown, and Thursday Island, Australia; Merauke, Dobo, Amboina, and Menado in the Netherlands East Indies; Cebu, Atimonan, Manila, and Aparri in the Philippines; Tamsui on Formosa; Shanghai in China; Mokpo in Korea; and Yamakawa and Kagoshima, Japan, before arriving in Tokyo on September 26. After a three-week stay there, they had begun their return journey on October 17, a 15,000-mile (24,155-kilometer) trip that they make in only 22 days, with stops at Kagoshima; Shanghai; Hong Kong; Haiphong and Saigon in French Indochina; Bangkok in Siam; Rangoon; Calcutta, Benares, Delhi, and Karachi in British India; Bandar Abbas in Persia; Baghdad; Alexandretta in Turkey; and Taranto in Italy before arriving in Rome. The entire journey, made without special preparations for support at any of the stops and involving two long flights – of  – across the dry land of the Indian Subcontinent in a non-amphibious flying boat, proceeds without major incident and requires only one engine change, carried out at Tokyo. Flight describes the journey as "the most extensive aerial tour on record." 
 November 20 – Germany holds a state funeral in Berlin for fighter pilot Manfred von Richthofen, the top-scoring ace of World War I with 80 aerial victories. He had been shot down and killed on 21 April 1918.

First flights
 Abrial A-2 Vautour
 Aero A.11
 Curtiss Carrier Pigeon
 Curtiss Lark
 Farman F.130
 Farman F.170 Jabiru
 Grigorovich SUVP
 Pitcairn PA-1 Fleetwing
 Potez 25
 Westland Yeovil

January
 Avia BH-21
 January 3 - Fairey Fox
 January 5 - Short Singapore

February
 Gloster Gamecock
 Latécoère 15
 Thomas-Morse TM-24
 February 22 – de Havilland Moth

March
 Avro 563 Andover
 March 10 – Supermarine Southampton

April
 April 22 – Junkers J 29

May
 May 2 - Douglas C-1
 May 10 - Armstrong Whitworth Atlas

June
 June 4 — Marinens Flyvebaatfabrikk M.F.9

July
 July 6 - Douglas DAM
 July 7 - Boeing 40
 July 29 - Blériot 155

August

 August 24 – Supermarine S.4
 August 29 – Gloster III

September
 September 11 – Curtiss R3C-1

November
 November 9 - Fairey Firefly (biplane)
 November 26 - Tupolev TB-1

December
 Curtiss P-2 Hawk
 Curtiss XP-2, a modified Curtiss P-2 Hawk

Entered service

January
 Kawanishi K-7 Transport Seaplane with Japan Aviation Company Ltd

May
 May 15 – Junkers G.23 with Swedish Air Lines

August
 Curtiss F6C with the United States Navy
 August 17 – Curtiss P-1 Hawk with 1st Pursuit Group, United States Army Air Service

December
 Handley Page Hyderabad with the Royal Air Force's No. 9 (Bomber) Squadron, last RAF heavy bomber of wooden construction to enter squadron service

Retirements
 May – Westland Weasel by the Royal Air Force
 Late 1925 – Westland Walrus by the Royal Air Force

Births
 March 20 – David Warren, Australian aviation scientist, inventor of the cockpit voice recorder (d. 2010)

References

 
Aviation by year